Jovica "Joco" Stokić (Serbian Cyrillic: Јовица "Јоцо" Стокић; born 7 April 1987 in Gradačac) is a Bosnian professional footballer who plays for FK Borac Šamac after a spell at FK Alfa Modriča.

Club career
After playing 5 years with FK Modriča he moved abroad to Hungary in summer 2010 by signing with Nemzeti Bajnokság I side Budapest Honvéd FC. During the winter break he moved back to Bosnia to play with NK Zvijezda Gradačac in the Bosnian Premier League but next summer he moved back to Hungary this time to play with another top flight club, Kecskeméti TE. During the winter break of the 2011-12 season he moved to Serbia to play with SuperLiga side FK BSK Borča. In summer 2017 he left Čelik Zenica after spells earlier in Kuwait and with Bosnian powerhouses Borac Banja Luka and Željezničar Sarajevo among others.

On 18 January 2019, Stokić joined OFK Sloga. Stokić then joined FK Alfa Modriča ahead of the 2019/20 season.

International career
He was part of the Bosnian U19 and U21 teams.

References

External links
 
 
 

1986 births
Living people
People from Gradačac
Association football midfielders
Bosnia and Herzegovina footballers
Bosnia and Herzegovina youth international footballers
FK Modriča players
Budapest Honvéd FC players
NK Zvijezda Gradačac players
Kecskeméti TE players
FK BSK Borča players
FK Borac Banja Luka players
Jeju United FC players
FK Željezničar Sarajevo players
FK Radnik Bijeljina players
Al Jahra SC players
NK Čelik Zenica players
FK Tuzla City players
FK Borac Šamac players
Premier League of Bosnia and Herzegovina players
Nemzeti Bajnokság I players
Serbian SuperLiga players
K League 1 players
Kuwait Premier League players
First League of the Republika Srpska players
Bosnia and Herzegovina expatriate footballers
Expatriate footballers in Hungary
Bosnia and Herzegovina expatriate sportspeople in Hungary
Expatriate footballers in Serbia
Bosnia and Herzegovina expatriate sportspeople in Serbia
Expatriate footballers in South Korea
Bosnia and Herzegovina expatriate sportspeople in South Korea
Expatriate footballers in Kuwait
Bosnia and Herzegovina expatriate sportspeople in Kuwait